Bojan Živković (born 10 November 1981) is a Serbian football midfielder who plays for Polet Ljubić.

References

External links
 
 Bojan Živković stats at utakmica.rs 
 

1981 births
Living people
People from Gornji Milanovac
Association football midfielders
Serbian footballers
FK Borac Čačak players
FK Remont Čačak players
FK Metalac Gornji Milanovac players
FK Jagodina players
FK Mladost Lučani players
Serbian SuperLiga players